3,4-Dimethoxystyrene (vinylveratrole) is an aromatic organic compound. It is a yellow oily liquid with a pleasant floral odor. Normally, it is supplied with 1-2% of the hydroquinone as an additive to prevent oxidation of the compound.

Occurrence

3,4-Dimethoxystyrene is found in the essential oil of Brazilian propolis.

Uses
3,4-Dimethoxystyrene is typically used in organic synthesis as a monomer in radical polymerization reactions due to the presence of the electron-deficient double bond. 
3,4-dimethoxystyrene can be deprotected using Lewis acid boron tribromide with almost 100% yield. The resulting compound 3,4-dihydroxystyrene is rapidly oxidized in air this is why 3,4-dimethoxystyrene is preferred as a stable precursor in organic synthesis.
To the chemical community, it presents interest as an easily polymerizable precursor to polycatechols as it is less susceptible to oxidation in air.

Related compounds
3,4-Dihydroxystyrene
Veratrole

References

Monomers
Vinyl compounds
Catechol ethers
Sweet-smelling chemicals
Methoxy compounds